Luis Lobo and Javier Sánchez were the defending champions, but Sánchez did not participate this year.  Lobo partnered Daniel Orsanic, losing in the first round.

Cyril Suk and Michael Tebbutt won the title, defeating Kent Kinnear and David Wheaton 4–6, 6–1, 7–6 in the final.

Seeds

  Mark Knowles /  Mark Woodforde (quarterfinals)
  Ellis Ferreira /  Rick Leach (first round)
  Patrick Galbraith /  David Macpherson (first round)
  Luis Lobo /  Daniel Orsanic (first round)

Draw

Draw

Qualifying

Qualifying seeds

Qualifiers
  Kent Kinnear /  David Wheaton

Qualifying draw

External links
 Official results archive (ATP)
 Official results archive (ITF)

Tennis Channel Open
1998 ATP Tour
1998 Tennis Channel Open